Oh Jin-hyek (Hanja: 吳真爀; born 15 August 1981) is a South Korean archer. Oh first competed for the Korean national team in 1999, but did not win a major individual international tournament until he won the gold medal in the Men's individual event at the 2012 Summer Olympics, also becoming the first Korean male archer to win an Olympic individual gold medal. With partners Im Dong-hyun and Kim Bub-min, he also finished in third place in the Men's team event. He was the world number one ranked archer from April 2013 to June 2014, winning the individual gold medal at the 2013 Archery World Cup Final and two individual silver medals at the 2011 and 2013 World Championships.

Oh competes for the Hyundai Steel corporate archery team and is known for his distinctive dynamic technique.

Oh won the Men's Team Gold Medal at the 2020 Summer Olympics for Team South Korea. Oh was the 3rd seed in the Olympics Men's Individual but lost in the Round of 16 to Indian archer Atanu Das.

Individual performance timeline

References

External links
 
 

South Korean male archers
Living people
Olympic archers of South Korea
Archers at the 2012 Summer Olympics
Archers at the 2020 Summer Olympics
1981 births
Olympic gold medalists for South Korea
Olympic bronze medalists for South Korea
Olympic medalists in archery
Medalists at the 2012 Summer Olympics
Asian Games medalists in archery
Archers at the 2010 Asian Games
Archers at the 2014 Asian Games
Archers at the 2018 Asian Games
World Archery Championships medalists
Asian Games gold medalists for South Korea
Asian Games silver medalists for South Korea
Asian Games bronze medalists for South Korea
Medalists at the 2010 Asian Games
Medalists at the 2014 Asian Games
Medalists at the 2018 Asian Games
Medalists at the 2020 Summer Olympics
20th-century South Korean people
21st-century South Korean people